Elijah Benton (born September 5, 1996) is an American football safety who is a free agent. He played college football at Liberty.

College career
Benton played college football at Liberty University.

Professional career

Cleveland Browns
Benton signed with the Cleveland Browns as an undrafted free agent on May 5, 2020. He was waived by the Browns on September 5, 2020, and signed to their practice squad the next day. Benton was elevated to the active roster on October 17 for the team's week 6 game against the Pittsburgh Steelers, and reverted to the practice squad after the game. He was placed on the practice squad/COVID-19 list by the team on December 22, 2020, and restored to the practice squad on January 6, 2021.

Benton was signed to a reserve/futures contract by the Browns on January 18, 2021. Benton was waived by the Browns on August 31, 2021.

New England Patriots
On October 6, 2021, Benton was signed to the New England Patriots practice squad. He was released on October 26, 2021.

Seattle Seahawks
On December 1, 2021, Benton was signed to the Seattle Seahawks practice squad. He was released on December 7.

New York Jets
On December 8, 2021, Benton was signed to the New York Jets practice squad. He was released on December 30.

Tennessee Titans
On August 9, 2022, Benton signed with the Tennessee Titans, but was waived a week later.

References

External links
Liberty Flames football bio

1996 births
Living people
American football safeties
Cleveland Browns players
Liberty Flames football players
New England Patriots players
New York Jets players
People from Forest, Virginia
Players of American football from Virginia
Seattle Seahawks players
Tennessee Titans players